Minister of Foreign Affairs of the Republic of Mali is a government minister in charge of the Ministry of Foreign Affairs of Mali, responsible for conducting foreign relations of the country.

The following is a list of foreign ministers of Mali since its founding in 1960:

Sources
Rulers.org – Foreign ministers L–R

Foreign
Foreign Ministers